The 1909 University of New Mexico football team was an American football team that represented the University of New Mexico as an independent during the 1909 college football season. The team compiled a 4–2 record and outscored opponents by a total of 117 to 75. Walter R. Allen was the team captain.

In September 1909, the school hired Sam P. McBirney as its head football coach. McBirnie was a resident of Tulsa, Oklahoma, who had coached an Oklahoma football team in 1908 and was regularly employed as a cashier at the Tulsa National Bank. After six weeks in Albuquerque, McBirnie returned to his home in Tulsa. Assistant coach Hamilton H. Conwell and Hugh J. Collins took over the coaching responsibilities for the final game of the season against New Mexico A&M.

In a season of highs and lows, the team achieved both its greatest margin of victory (51–0 over New Mexico A&M) and its greatest margin of defeat (0–53 against Colorado) to that point in program history.

At the end of the season, University of New Mexico players won six of eleven spots on the All-New Mexico football team: Silva at center; "Doc" Cornish at quarterback; McConnell at right tackle; Price at left tackle; Galles at end; and Walt Allen at right halfback.

Schedule

References

New Mexico
New Mexico Lobos football seasons
New Mexico Football